Ti Rocher is a settlement in the Castries District on the island of Saint Lucia.  The village is located near the center of the island, near Four Roads Junction, Dubrassay, and Trois Pitons. It is nestled between the peaks of Mount du Chazeau and Gros Morne which separate the basin of Castries from the Valley of the Cul de Sac River.

See also
Casteries District
List of cities in Saint Lucia
List of rivers in Saint Lucia
Ti Rocher, Micoud

References 

Towns in Saint Lucia